Lubień is a village in the administrative district of Gmina Wyryki, within Włodawa County, Lublin Voivodeship, in eastern Poland.

References

Villages in Włodawa County